This is a list of shopping malls and shopping centers in Japan.

Shopping malls in Japan

 Lalaport, Tokyo Bay in Minami-Funabashi
 Abeno Cues Town
 Æon Mall, Æon Mall Kyoto Gojō and 143 places in nationwide.
 Ario, 18 places in Sapporo, Sendai, Greater Tokyo area, Nagano Prefecture, Osaka Prefecture and Kurashiki.
 Bell Mall, Utsunomiya
 Canal City Hakata
 DiverCity Tokyo Plaza, Odaiba 
 Grandberry Park, Minami-Machida 
 HEP Five
 Landmark Plaza, Minato Mirai 21
 Lalaport, Lalagarden, Lala Terrace, 19 places in Greater Tokyo area, Kansai region, Sendai and Iwata.
 Lazona Kawasaki Plaza
 Nikke Colton Plaza
 Palette Town, Tokyo
 Queen's Square, Yokohama 
 Seiyu Group
 Shonan Mall Fill 
 Yaesu Chikagai
 Yanagase
 Yebisu Garden Place
 Youme Town, 64 places in Kyushu, Shikoku and Chūgoku region, western Japan.

See also
 Lists of shopping malls

References

Japan
 
Shopping malls
Shopping malls